Personation of a juror is a common law offence in England and Wales, where a person impersonates a juror in a civil or criminal trial. As a common law offence it is punishable by unlimited imprisonment and/or an unlimited fine. Personation of a juror also constitutes a contempt of court.

There is no requirement to prove that the defendant had any corrupt motive or a specific intention to deceive other than the fact that they entered the jury box and took the oath in someone else's name, and it is no defence that they did not know what they did to be wrong. If a juror has been personated, the trial in which he sat can be voided.

See also
Perverting the course of justice

References

R v Clark (1918) 82 JP 295, (1918) 26 Cox CC 138
R v Levy (1916) 32 TLR 238
R v Wakefield [1918] 1 KB 216, 13 Cr App R 56, CCA

Crimes
English criminal law